Magnhild Folkvord (born 27 November 1945) is a Norwegian journalist and biographer.

Background
Folkvord is from Frol and is an older sister of Erling Folkvord. She moved to Oslo to take a cand.mag. degree at the University of Oslo, but as a member of the Workers' Communist Party she dropped out of the master's studies to self-proletarize.

Work
Folkvord was an ironworker at Jøtul for fourteen years.

After resigning she eventually became a journalist in the former Workers' Communist Party newspaper Klassekampen in 1999. She worked there until 2015 and wrote political books. She also wrote a biography on Fredrikke Marie Qvam in 2013, leading to her resigning from the newspaper and writing more biographies, on Betzy Kjelsberg in 2015 and Magnhild Haalke in 2019.

References

1945 births
Living people
People from Levanger
University of Oslo alumni
Workers' Communist Party (Norway) politicians
Norwegian feminists
Norwegian journalists
Norwegian biographers
Nynorsk-language writers
Norwegian socialist feminists
Women biographers
Norwegian women journalists
20th-century Norwegian women writers
21st-century Norwegian women writers